Teuta Matoshi (born 24 October) is a Kosovo-Albanian fashion designer. She is known for her whimsical style of high-end gowns.

Early life and education
Matoshi was born outside of Pristina to a Kosovo Albanian family of 9 children, their father a teacher and their mother a stay-at-home mother. Her younger sister, Lirika Matoshi, is also a fashion designer and another sister, Sanije, helps with the businesses. Teuta studied at Design Factory and the University of Pristina Faculty of Arts.

Career
Matoshi started designing at a young age. She launched her line in 2007 and later opened a shop in Pristina where she initially sold jackets before shifting her focus. She makes a point of giving as many jobs to local women in Kosovo as possible. She gained national as well as international attention for her "princess-like" gowns. She opened an atelier in SoHo, Manhattan with her sister in 2019 that houses both of their brands. They make a point of employing local women in Kosovo.
In 2022 she designed a custom wedding dress for YouTuber, Mia Maples.

Personal life
Matoshi is married to Artan Duriqi; they have a daughter and two sons.

References

External links
  (business)
  (personal)

Living people
Kosovo Albanians
Kosovan fashion designers
Kosovan Muslims
Muslim fashion designers
University of Pristina alumni
Kosovan women fashion designers
Year of birth missing (living people)